Çokak is a village in Tarsus district of Mersin Province, Turkey. It is situated in the southern slopes of Taurus Mountains to the east of Turkish state highway . The population of the village was 247 as of 2012. The main agricultural product of the village is grapes.

References

Villages in Tarsus District